Dadgar refers to a village in Iran. It may also refer to:

 Dadgar (name), list of people with the name
 Dadgar (magazine), Persian legal magazine in Canada